Russia first competed in the Junior Eurovision Song Contest in . Their worst result to date has been achieved by Tanya Mezhentseva and Denberel Oorzhak with the song "A Time for Us" in the Junior Eurovision Song Contest 2019 where they placed 13th.

RTR has represented Russia at the Junior Eurovision Song Contest. The broadcaster has selected Ekaterina Ryabova to represent Russia at the Junior Eurovision Song Contest 2009 in Kyiv with the song "Malenkiy prints". Ekaterina Ryabova represented Russia once again in 2011 with the song  "Kak Romeo i Dzhulyetta". She was also the first returning artist in the history of the Junior Eurovision.

Russia had initially confirmed their participation in the 2022 contest, however on 26 February 2022, the Russian broadcasters VGTRK and Channel One Russia suspended their EBU membership after the country was excluded from participating in the Eurovision Song Contest 2022 due to the Russian invasion of Ukraine, rendering potential participation in the 2022 contest and future contests impossible.

Participation overview 
Here is a list of all and songs and their respective performers that have represented Russia in the contest:

Photogallery

Commentators and spokespersons

See also
Russia in the Eurovision Dance Contest
Russia in the Eurovision Song Contest
Russia in the Türkvizyon Song Contest

Notes

References 

 
Countries in the Junior Eurovision Song Contest